The 1906 University of Utah football team was an American football team that represented the University of Utah as an independent during the 1906 college football season. In its third season under head coach Joe Maddock, the team compiled a 6–1 record, shut out six of seven opponents, and outscored all opponents by a total of 170 to 6. The team played its home games at Cummings Field in Salt Lake City. Fred Bennion, who later served as the team's head coach, was the team captain.

Schedule

References

University of Utah
Utah Utes football seasons
University of Utah football